Rufus Frazier "Shirt" Smith (January 24, 1905 – August 21, 1984) was a Major League Baseball pitcher. He played in one game for the Detroit Tigers on October 2, .

External links

1905 births
1984 deaths
Detroit Tigers players
Major League Baseball pitchers
Baseball players from North Carolina
Guilford Quakers baseball players
Sportspeople from Aiken, South Carolina